East/West is the 18th album, first double CD and first live album by Bill Frisell to be released on the Elektra Nonesuch label. Released in 2005, it features performances by Frisell, Viktor Krauss and Kenny Wollesen which were recorded at Yoshi's in Oakland, California on May 8-11, 2003 (CD 1 – West) and performances by Frisell with Tony Scherr and Kenny Wollesen recorded on December 9-12, 2003 at the Village Vanguard in New York City (CD2 – East). An additional second set of material from both the "East" and "West" venues was made available as a downloadable album Further East/Further West.

Reception
The Allmusic review by Sean Westergaard awarded the album 4 stars, stating, "The group improvisations also add a bit of spark. Folks who discovered Frisell in the late '90s with albums like Nashville are going to love this set.".

Track listing
All compositions by Bill Frisell except as indicated.

Disc One – West
 "I Heard It Through the Grapevine" (Strong, Whitfield) – 8:00 
 "Blues for Los Angeles" – 11:09        
 Shenandoah" (Traditional) – 12:05        
 "Boubacar" – 6:22     
 "Pipe Down" –  10:50      
 "A Hard Rain's A-Gonna Fall" (Dylan) – 11:49

Disc Two – East
 "My Man's Gone Now" (Gershwin, Gershwin, Heyward) – 3:48       
 "The Days of Wine and Roses" (Mancini, Mercer) – 9:20 
 "You Can Run" (Frisell, Scherr, Wollesen) – 0:51         
 "Ron Carter" – 13:59       
 "Interlude" (Frisell, Scherr, Wollesen) – 1:39      
 "Goodnight Irene" (Ledbetter, Lomax) – 8:57 
 "The Vanguard" (Frisell, Scherr, Wollesen) – 4:44       
 "People" (Merrill, Styne) – 4:29
 "Crazy" (Nelson) – 4:31      
 "Tennessee Flat Top Box" (Cash) – 2:28

Personnel
Bill Frisell – guitars and electronic effects
Kenny Wollesen – drums
Viktor Krauss – bass (Disc 1 – West)
Tony Scherr – bass, acoustic guitar (Disc 2 – East)

References 

Bill Frisell live albums
2005 live albums
Nonesuch Records live albums
Albums recorded at the Village Vanguard